The 2012 Pan American Archery Championships was held in San Salvador, El Salvador from May 21 to 26, 2012.

Medal summary

Recurve

Compound

References

Pan American Archery Championships
2012 in archery
International archery competitions hosted by El Salvador